Strawberries and Cream is the second studio album by the American musical comedy duo Ninja Sex Party. The album was released on April 15, 2013. Three tracks from the album, "FYI I Wanna F Your A", "Next to You", and "Unicorn Wizard", were released as singles prior to the album's release. The album was a modest success worldwide.

Track listing

Personnel

Ninja Sex Party
 Dan Avidan – vocals
 Brian Wecht – music, production, background vocals (tracks 7, 8 and 9)

Crew
 David Dominguez – co-producer, recording
 Dan Castellani, Jr. – mixing
 Hans DeKline – mastering

Charts

Weekly charts

Year-end charts

References

2013 albums
Ninja Sex Party albums